Mohammad Javad Mohammadi (born July 20, 1996) is an Iranian footballer who plays as a midfielder for Iranian club Havadar in the Persian Gulf Pro League.

References

External links 
 

Living people
1996 births
Association football midfielders
Iranian footballers
Esteghlal F.C. players
Havadar S.C. players